Rafael Lledó (2 March 1922 – 9 August 1991) was an Argentine basketball player who competed in the 1948 Summer Olympics and in the 1952 Summer Olympics. Lledó was born in Santiago del Estero on 2 March 1922. died on 9 August 1991, at the age of 69.

References

External links
 

1922 births
1991 deaths
Argentine men's basketball players
Olympic basketball players of Argentina
Basketball players at the 1948 Summer Olympics
Basketball players at the 1952 Summer Olympics